Kuptsov (from купец meaning merchant) is a Russian masculine surname, its feminine counterpart is Kuptsova. It may refer to
Andriy Kuptsov (born 1971), Ukrainian football player
Artyom Kuptsov (born 1984), Russian pole vaulter
Marina Kuptsova (born 1981), Russian high jumper 
Pavel Kuptsov (born 1998), Belarusian football player
Vasily Kuptsov (1899–1935), Russian painter

Russian-language surnames